The 2007 CIAA basketball tournament took place between February 26 and March 3, 2007 in Charlotte, North Carolina at the Charlotte Bobcats Arena.

Elizabeth City State won the men's championship securing a spot in the NCAA men's Division II basketball championship, and North Carolina Central won the women's championship to advance to the NCAA women's Division II women's basketball championship.

Men's bracket

Play-in round
Wed Feb 28
 8 NC Central def. 9 Saint Paul's 75-74
 7 Elizabeth City State def. 10 Livingstone 71-54
 6 Bowie State def. 11 Shaw 82-65

Women's bracket

Play-in round
Mon Feb 26
 8 Virginia State def. 9 Virginia Union 57-46
 10 Saint Paul's def. 7 Livingstone 58-56
 6 Johnson C. Smith def. 11 Saint Augustine's 58-45

External links
 Tournament Website 

2006–07 in American college basketball
Central Intercollegiate Athletic Association men's basketball
Basketball competitions in Charlotte, North Carolina
2007 in sports in North Carolina